In enzymology, a phenylalanine N-acetyltransferase is an enzyme that catalyzes the chemical reaction

acetyl-CoA + L-phenylalanine  CoA + N-acetyl-L-phenylalanine

Thus, the two substrates of this enzyme are acetyl-CoA and L-phenylalanine, whereas its two products are CoA and N-acetyl-L-phenylalanine.

This enzyme belongs to the family of transferases, specifically those acyltransferases transferring groups other than aminoacyl groups.  The systematic name of this enzyme class is acetyl-CoA:L-phenylalanine N-acetyltransferase. This enzyme is also called acetyl-CoA-L-phenylalanine alpha-N-acetyltransferase.  This enzyme participates in phenylalanine metabolism.

References

 

EC 2.3.1
Enzymes of unknown structure